The Grisons or Graubünden, more formally the Canton of the Grisons or the Canton of Graubünden, is one of the twenty-six cantons of Switzerland. It has eleven regions, and its capital is Chur. The German name of the canton, translates as the "Grey Leagues", referring to the canton's origin in three local alliances, the Three Leagues. The Alpine ibex is the canton's heraldic symbol.

The largest and easternmost canton of Switzerland, it is also one of the three large southern Alpine cantons, along with Valais and Ticino. It is the most diverse canton in terms of natural and cultural geography, as it encompasses both sides of the Alps and several natural and cultural regions. The diversity of the canton is often compared to that of Switzerland as a whole and warrants it the name of "Little Switzerland". The Grisons is bordered  by four cantons: Ticino to the south; Uri to the west; and Glarus and St. Gallen to the north. The canton is also bordered by Liechtenstein to the north; Austria's federated states of Vorarlberg and Tyrol to the north and east; and Italy's autonomous province of South Tyrol and region of Lombardy to the south.

The Grisons is the only trilingual canton of Switzerland. It is also the only one where Romansh, Switzerland's fourth national language, has official status. Romansh language and culture is an important part of local identity. It is the least densely populated canton of Switzerland. The only sizable city in the canton is Chur, as the majority of the population lives in mountainous areas, including some of the most remote valleys of the country. One of the birthplaces of winter sports, the canton is a major tourist destination year-round, including a large number of Alpine resort towns, notably Davos and St. Moritz. The canton is also renowned for its extensive narrow-gauge railway network, operated by the Rhaetian Railway, and linking the capital with most valleys of the Grisons.

Formerly occupied by the Rhaeti, most of the lands of the canton became part of the Roman province called Raetia, which was established in 15 BC, with Curia, a settlement dating back to the Pfyn culture, as capital city. The area later became part of the lands of the diocese of Chur. The late middle ages saw the foundation of the League of God's House, the Grey League and the League of the Ten Jurisdictions. In 1471 an alliance gave birth to the Three Leagues, and before the end of the 15th century, the latter became an ally of the Old Swiss Confederacy. In 1803 the Three Leagues finally became one of the cantons of the Confederation.

Geography and climate

The Grisons is Switzerland's largest and at the same time easternmost canton. Its geography, essentially marked by the Alps, is complex and encompasses a wide range of climates and ecosystems. It is one of the three large southern Alpine cantons, along with Ticino and Valais, which comprehend regions on the south side of the Alps. But contrary to those (and all other cantons), it fully extends on both sides of the great Alpine barrier, from the northern plains at Maienfeld to the southern plains at Roveredo. However, a large portion of the canton is neither clearly north nor south of the Alps, it is the Engadin (the "garden of the Inn"), a large inner Alpine valley oriented towards eastern Europe. Therefore the canton comprehends four of the five drainage basins of the country. The north of the canton is drained by the Rhine (ending in the North Sea), the south by the Po and Adige through several affluents (Mediterranean Sea), and the Engadin by the Danube through the Inn (Black Sea).

It is both one of the highest and lowest cantons, and the second-highest when considering mean elevation. As a consequence, its topography is extremely rugged and many of the highest settlements in the country (and Europe) are found there, notably in the Upper Engadin. The mountains are numerous and largely over 1,000 summits can be found in the canton. The highest is Piz Bernina, closely followed by numerous peaks in the homonymous range. Other prominent mountains are Piz Russein, Piz Kesch, Calanda, Aroser Rothorn and Rheinwaldhorn, see list of mountains of Graubünden for a more exhaustive list. The canton includes numerous subranges of the Alps other than the Bernina. These are the Albula, the Bregaglia, the Glarus, the Gotthard, the Lepontine, the Livigno, the Plessur, the Oberhalbstein, the Ortler, the Rätikon, the Samnaun, the Sesvenna and the Silvretta ranges.

The regions on the north side of the Alps are all drained by the Rhine and form an intricate network of valleys. The Rhine is both one of the longest rivers within the canton and the only one flowing directly into a sea. The sources of the Rhine are found in the west of the canton and form the Anterior Rhine and the Posterior Rhine. These two rivers converge at Reichenau to form the Rhine in the strict sense of the term. Just after the convergence, the valley opens and its floor constitutes the flattest plains of the canton, from Domat/Ems to Fläsch at the St. Gallen border. In the area around Chur, at the foot of the Calanda, the Rhine progressively changes its direction, from eastward to northward. The Anterior Rhine and Posterior Rhine include numerous tributaries as well before their own convergence. The former constitutes a long and straight valley, the Surselva, shut off from the lower plains by the Rhine Gorge. Its biggest tributaries are the rivers Glogn, Valser Rhine, Rabiusa, forming respectively the Val Lumnezia, the Vals Valley and the Safiental. The other one, the Posterior Rhine, notably collects the waters of the Avers Rhine and the Albula, which in turn collects the waters of the Gelgia and the Landwasser. Similarly to the Anterior Rhine, the upper portion of the Posterior Rhine is also shut off from the plains by the Viamala Gorge. After the convergence with the Albula, the Posterior Rhine forms a wide valley, the Domleschg, until it meets its anterior counterpart. After that, the Rhine collects the water of two important rivers: the Plessur at Chur, forming the valley of the Schanfigg, and the Landquart at the homonymous town, forming the Prätigau.

The Engadin is entirely drained by the Inn and is the only valley in Switzerland in the Danube basin. The Inn is one of the longest rivers in the canton and forms an almost straight valley, from the Maloja Pass to Martina, with a change of direction near Zernez. Despite its length and numerous tributaries, only a few long rivers converge with the Inn. These are the Flaz (forming the Val Bernina), the Spöl (forming the Val da Spöl) and the Clemgia (forming the Val S-charl). In the lower part of the Engadin is also the side valley of Samnaun. The main passes connecting the Engadin with the northern Grisons are (from west to east): the Julier Pass, the Albula Pass and the Flüela Pass.

The valleys on the south side of the Alps are not contiguous to each other and form four distinct regions. The Mesolcina, drained by the Moesa, the Val Bregaglia, drained by the Mera, the Val Poschiavo, drained by the Poschiavino, and the Val Müstair, drained by the Rom. The first three are in the Po basin and the last one is in the Adige basin. While the first two (Mesolcina and Bregaglia) are contiguous to the region north of the Alps, through the San Bernardino Pass, and the Septimer Pass respectively, the three last ones (Bregaglia, Poschiavo and Müstair) are contiguous to the Engadin, through the Maloja Pass, the Bernina Pass, and the Ofen Pass.

Although no large bodies of water are found in the canton, numerous mountain lakes (above 800 m elevation) dot the landscape, some of them being used as reservoirs for hydroelectricity production. The largest natural lakes are Lake Sils, Lake Silvaplana, Lago di Poschiavo and Lake St. Moritz (all in Upper Engadin except that of Poschiavo). Artificial lakes are more numerous, the largest (over 100 ha) being Lago di Livigno, Lago di Lei, Lai da Sontga Maria, Zervreilasee, Lago Bianco, Lai da Marmorera and Lägh da l'Albigna. The total number of lakes has been estimated to 600. See list of mountain lakes of Switzerland for a more exhaustive list.

Unlike other large cantons, the Grisons includes very few cities. The largest (and capital city) is Chur. It is followed by Davos, Landquart, Domat/Ems and St. Moritz, which are, however, far less populated. The canton is particularly renowned for its numerous Alpine resort towns, notably two of the aforementioned ones (Davos and St. Moritz), but also Klosters, Arosa, Lenzerheide, Disentis, Flims, Pontresina and Scuol.

The diversity of the climate of the Grisons is high and comparable to that of Switzerland. In the southernmost and lowest regions, vineyards and olives are grown, while on the highest summits, snow is found year-round. The inner valleys, particularly the Engadin, are significantly drier than the north and south side of the Alps, being sheltered by the high mountains of the range. The southern valleys are also significantly wetter than the rest of the canton (1,476 mm of rain in Grono, 849 mm in Chur, and 705 mm in Scuol). The coldest places are naturally at high elevations, such as on Piz Corvatsch. The low-elevation region of Chur, including the Bündner Herrschaft, experiences naturally less harsh temperatures with an average of 10.0 °C.

Only about a third of this is commonly regarded as productive land of which forests cover about a fifth of the total area.
The canton is almost entirely mountainous and it is the most sparsely populated region of the country. In its southeastern part lies the only official Swiss National Park. In its northern part, the mountains were formed as part of the thrust fault that was in 2008 declared a geologic UNESCO World Heritage Site, under the name Swiss Tectonic Arena Sardona. Another Biosphere Reserve is the Biosfera Val Müstair adjacent to the Swiss National Park, while Ela Nature Park is one of the regionally supported parks.

The Grisons is sometimes included in the larger region of Eastern Switzerland, together with six other cantons. The Grisons shares border with numerous regions of Europe, reflecting its cultural diversity, and is the only canton adjacent to three different countries. On the national level it shares borders with four other cantons: Uri, Glarus, St. Gallen to the northwest (essentially across the Glarus Alps) and Ticino to the west (essentially across the Gotthard Massif and the Lepontine Alps but also at the level of the plain at Roveredo). On the international level, the canton shares borders with three countries: Liechtenstein to the north, the Austrian regions of Vorarlberg and Tyrol to the northeast and the Italian regions of Trentino-South Tyrol and Lombardy to the south.

History

The deep Alpine valleys of the present-day Grisons were originally settled by the Raetians (Rhaeti). In Chur, archaeological evidence of settlement goes back as far as the Pfyn culture (3900-3500 BC), making the capital city of the Grisons one of the oldest settlements in Switzerland.

Most of the lands of the canton were once part of a Roman province called Raetia, which was established in 15 BC. The current capital of the Grisons, Chur, was known as Curia in Roman times. The area later was part of the lands of the diocese of Chur.

In 1367 the League of God's House (Cadi, Gottes Haus, Ca' di Dio) was founded to resist the rising power of the Bishop of Chur. This was followed by the establishment of the Grey League (Grauer Bund), sometimes called Oberbund, in 1395 in the Upper Rhine valley. The name Grey League is derived from the homespun grey clothes worn by the people and was used exclusively after 16 March 1424. The name of this league later gave its name to the canton of the Grisons. A third league was established in 1436 by the people of ten bailiwicks in the former Toggenburg countship, as the dynasty of Toggenburg had become extinct. The league was called League of the Ten Jurisdictions (Zehngerichtebund).

The first step towards the canton of the Grisons was when the league of the Ten Jurisdictions allied with the League of God's House in 1450. In 1471 the two leagues allied with the Grey League. In 1497 and 1498 the Leagues allied with the Old Swiss Confederacy after the Habsburgs acquired the possessions of the extinct Toggenburg dynasty in 1496, siding with the Confederacy in the Swabian War three years later. The Habsburgs were defeated at Calven Gorge and Dornach, helping the Swiss Confederation and the allied leagues of the canton of the Grisons to be recognised. However the Three Leagues remained a loose association until the Bundesbrief of 23 September 1524.

The last traces of the Bishop of Chur's jurisdiction were abolished in 1526. The Musso war of 1520 drove the Three Leagues closer to the Swiss Confederacy.

Between 1618 and 1639 it became a battleground between competing factions during the Bündner Wirren. The Protestant party was supported by France and Venice, while the Catholic party was supported by the Habsburgs in Spain and Austria. Each side sought to gain control of the Grisons to gain control over the important alpine passes. In 1618, the young radical Jörg Jenatsch became a member of the court of 'clerical overseers' and a leader of the anti-Habsburg faction. He supervised the torture to death of the arch-priest Nicola Rusca of Sondrio. In response, Giacomo Robustelli of the pro-Catholic Planta family, raised an army of rebels in the Valtellina. On the evening of 18/19 July 1620, a force of Valtellina rebels supported by Austrian and Italian troops marched into Tirano and began killing Protestants. When they finished in Tirano, they marched to Teglio, Sondrio and further down the valley killing every Protestant that they found. Between 500 and 600 people were killed on that night and in the following four days. The attack drove nearly all the Protestants out of the valley, prevented further Protestant incursions and took the Valtellina out of the Three Leagues.

In response, in February 1621, Jenatsch led a force of anti-Habsburg troops to attack Rietberg Castle, the home of a leader of the pro-Catholic faction, Pompeius Planta. They surprised Planta and according to legend he was killed by Jörg Jenatsch with an axe. The murder of Planta encouraged the Protestant faction and they assembled a poorly led and disorganized army to retake the Valtellina and other subject lands. However, the army fell apart before they could attack a single Catholic town. This Protestant invasion provided the Spanish and Austrians with an excuse to invade the Leagues. By the end of October, Spain and Austria had occupied all of the Grisons. The resulting peace treaty of January 1622, forced Grisons to cede the Müstair, the Lower Engadine and Prättigau valleys. The treaty also forbade the Protestant religion in these valleys. In response, in 1622, the Prättigau valley rebelled against the Austrians and drove them out of the valley. The Austrians invaded the valley twice more, attempting to reimpose the Catholic faith, in 1623–24 and 1629–31.

In 1623 the Leagues entered into an alliance with France, Savoy and Venice. Jürg Jenatsch and Ulysses von Salis used French money to hire an 8,000-man mercenary army and drive out the Austrians. The peace treaty of Monzon (5 March 1626) between France and Spain, confirmed the political and religious independence of the Valtellina. In 1627 the French withdrew from the Valtellina valley, which was then occupied by Papal troops. Starting in 1631 the League, under the French Duke Henri de Rohan, started to expel the Spaniards. However, Richelieu still did not want to hand the valley over to its residents. When it became clear that the French intended to remain permanently in the Leagues, but would not force the Valtellina to convert to Protestantism, Jürg Jenatsch (now a mercenary leader) converted in 1635 to the Catholic faith. In 1637, he rebelled and allied with Austria and Spain. His rebellion along with the rebellion of 31 other League officers forced the French to withdraw without a fight. On 24 January 1639, Jürg Jenatsch was killed during Carnival by an unknown attacker who was dressed as a bear. The attacker may have been a son of Pompeius Planta or an assassin hired by the local aristocracy. According to legend he was killed by the same axe that he used on Pompeius Planta. On 3 September 1639 the Leagues agreed with Spain to bring the Valtellina back under League sovereignty, but with the promise to respect the free exercise of the Catholic faith. Treaties with Austria in 1649 and 1652, brought the Müstair and Lower Engadine valleys back under the authority of the Three Leagues.

In 1798, the lands of the canton of the Grisons became part of the Helvetic Republic as the canton of Raetia except Valtellina, which was separated in 1797 for joining the Cisalpine Republic. It was later part of the Empire of Austria in 1814 before joining the Kingdom of Italy in 1859. With the Act of Mediation the "perpetual ally" of Switzerland became a canton in 1803. The constitution of the canton dates from 1892. In the following century, there have been about 30 changes made to the constitution.

The arms of the three original leagues were combined into the modern cantonal coat of arms in 1933.

Government

The Grand Council, the legislature of the canton, sits in Chur, the cantonal capital. Its 120 members, elected in 39 districts using a majority system, are in office for four years. The last district elections were in 2014. The cantonal government, exercising executive authority, is made up of five members, elected by the people for a term of four years and limited to three terms using a majority system.

The constitution of the Grisons, last revised on 14 September 2003, states in its preamble that the canton's purpose is to "safeguard freedom, peace, and human dignity, ensure democracy and the Rechtsstaat, promote prosperity and social justice and preserving a sane environment for the future generations, with the intention of promoting trilingualism and cultural variety and conserving them as part of our historical heritage".

The constitution allows for the enfranchisement of foreign residents at a municipal level, at discretion of the local governments. In 2009, the municipality of Bregaglia became the first in the canton to make use of this provision, granting voting rights to foreigners.

Politics

Federal election results

 FDP before 2009, FDP.The Liberals after 2009
 "*" indicates that the party was not on the ballot in this canton.

Political subdivisions

Regions
as of January 2017

 Albula with capital Tiefencastel
 Bernina with capital Poschiavo
 Engiadina Bassa/Val Müstair with capital Scuol
 Imboden with capital Domat/Ems
 Landquart with capital Igis
 Maloja with capital Samedan
 Moesa with capital Roveredo
 Plessur with capital Chur
 Prättigau/Davos with capital Davos
 Surselva with capital Ilanz
 Viamala Region with capital Thusis

Municipalities
There are 114 municipalities in the canton.

Demographics

The inhabitants of the Grisons are called Bündner or (rarely) Grisonians.

, the population included 28,008 foreigners, or about 14.84% of the total population. The main religions are Catholicism and Protestantism. Both are well represented in the canton, with Roman Catholics forming a slight plurality (47% Catholic to 41% Protestant).

Languages

The Grisons is the only canton of Switzerland with three official languages: German (74.7%), Romansh (13.9%), and Italian (13.9%) with the remaining 13% speaking another language natively.

The Romansh language is spoken only in the Grisons. It consists of five dialect groups, each with its own written language: Sursilvan, Vallader, Puter, Surmiran and Sutsilvan. There also exists a common written language called Rumantsch Grischun.
Romansh has been recognized as one of four "national languages" by the Swiss Federal Constitution since 1938. It was declared an "official language" of the Confederation in 1996, meaning that Romansh speakers may use Romansh for correspondence with the federal government and expect to receive a response in Rumantsch Grischun.
Romansh has official language status at the canton level. Municipalities in turn are free to specify their own official languages.

Economy

Agriculture is still essential to keep remote valleys inhabited and cultivated, differing it from sheer wilderness. Agriculture is therefore supported by subsidies by the authorities both national and regional. Eight per cent of the population work in agriculture and forestry, where 50 per cent of the production is certified as organic. Agriculture includes forests and mountain pasturage in summer, particularly of cows, sheep and goats.
Since wolf and bear have returned, the use of Maremma Sheepdogs is not unusual. Although mountain pastures are predominant, there is also wine production in the Rhine Valley, particularly in Fläsch, Maienfeld, Jenins and Malans. This areas is referred to as the Bündner Herschaft. In the southern valleys of Mesolcina and Val Poschiavo there is corn (maize) and chestnut farming, allowed by the milder climate. In the Mesolcina, olive trees are also grown.

24 per cent of the workforce are employed in industry whereas 68 per cent work in the service industry. The most industrialized region is naturally that of Chur. Ems-Chemie is based in Domat/Ems and is a major employer in the area.

The tourism industry is a major player and reaches a remarkable 14 per cent of the GDP. Tourism is concentrated around the towns of Davos, Klosters, Lenzerheide, Arosa, Flims,  St. Moritz and Pontresina, which have large ski areas. There are, however, a great number of other tourist resorts in the canton, divided by the official tourist board for winter sports for example into categories "Top - Large - Small and beautiful". St. Moritz is one of the oldest winter sport resorts, being popular in winter since 1864. The following year, Davos also saw its first tourists in winter. St. Moritz hosted the 1928 Winter Olympics and the 1948 Winter Olympics. Summer tourism is also an important source of revenue. Trekking, mountaineering, and mountain biking are some of the main activities. Business tourism is also a source of revenue, notably in Davos, where the World Economic Forum meetings are traditionally organised.

Transport

As the canton extends on both sides of the great Alpine barrier, many important mountain passes are found there, particularly on the north-south axis. Transport has always been an important issue in the area; cart tracks from the Roman era were found on Julier Pass and Septimer Pass was rebuilt for cart use in 1387 and, although it later became unimportant, it is still in its 1800 form (for hikers only). Corniche paths were necessary for long stretches, and gorges such as the Viamala gave construction problems for any kind of transport. The first real roads of  width were built across the Alps from around 1816, one of which is still in a very good historical condition as this connection across Splügen Pass lost its importance after the opening of rail tunnels crossing the alps. The last valley to be connected to the road system in the Grisons was Avers, whose remote hamlet of Juf was only reached in 1897. After the Swiss Post expanded their Postal Bus transport services, the region's inhabitants became more used to motorized traffic. In 1925, there were already 250 vehicles in service. Eventually, the inhabitants of the Grisons gave up their resistance against individual motor traffic in 1926, In 1967 opened San Bernardino road tunnel, built to host tourism traffic, is used also by heavy goods vehicles nowadays although not really suitable for them because of its ascent gradients. Most other passes have lost their importance for goods transport nowadays.

Unlike Valais and Ticino, the Grisons does not benefit from major railway axes across the Alps such as the Lötschberg and Gotthard. As a consequence, the only standard gauge railway in the canton is that of the Rhine Valley, ending at Chur station. Conversely, the latter has become a major railway station and a transport hub of the canton since the construction of the Rhaetian Railway, which links most regions of the canton from the Rhine Valley.

Huge efforts ensure public transport to (nearly) every settlement by an integrated timetable of different transport companies. Even Juf, inhabited by some 30 people only but holding a European record, is reached 5 times a day by public transport. The two main transport companies are PostBus, the national post bus company, and the Rhaetian Railway, essentially owned by the cantonal government. The latter uses the largest narrow-gauge railway network in Switzerland and serves most regions of the canton, with branches towards Central Switzerland and Italy. This network is notably travelled by two of the longest distance trains of Switzerland: the Glacier Express and the Bernina Express. The Swiss Federal Railways extend only a few kilometres into the canton, from Maienfeld, and serve essentially Landquart and Chur, where passengers transfer to the Rhaetian Railway and a large number of PostBus routes. The Albula Line became a UNESCO world heritage as did the Bernina Railway, the highest and only railway to cross the Alps without the use of a tunnel at the pass. In winter some of the road passes are closed  whereas several high mountain passes such as the Julier, Bernina and Lukmanier are kept open all winter (subject to restrictions). Being the highest elevated state in Switzerland, the Grisons hosts huge alpine areas that are not accessible by any means of transport but have to be walked to. A large number of cable transport facilities provide easy access to some of the mountains of the Grisons, the highest being on Piz Corvatsch.

The Engadin valley has its own airport, Samedan Airport. It is the highest airport in Switzerland.

Culture

The Grisons is culturally the most diverse region of Switzerland. Its common denominator, however, is a strong mountain culture marked by life in isolated rural communities, notably depicted in Johanna Spyri's Heidi. Traditional customs include Alpine transhumance in spring and autumn, and the Chalandamarz at the end of winter.

The canton has a large concentration of medieval castles (and ruins). The most notable, in the Engadin, is that of Tarasp, guarding the Inn valley. Many ruins and castles are found in the Domleschg area. Close by lies the church of Zillis, where 1130/40 a famous romanesque illustrated ceiling was added which is now treated as national heritage. Three World Heritage Sites are located in the canton: the Benedictine Convent of Saint John, the Swiss Tectonic Arena Sardona and the Rhaetian Railway in the Albula and Bernina Landscapes.

The gastronomy of the Grisons is mostly known for a dried-beef delicacy called Bündnerfleisch, often simply referred to as Grisons Meat. Other meat specialities include dried sausages (especially Salsiz, made of various meats), speck and ham. Cheeses produced in the Grisons are also numerous. Among notable dishes are the Capuns, predominantly made in the western part of the Grisons. Capuns consist of hearty dumplings with pieces of meat wrapped in chard leaves, then gratinated in oven with cheese and cream. The Maluns are another well-known dish of the Grisons. They are made of boiled potatoes mixed with flour, then fried in butter. Maluns are typically served with a compote of apples and various other local products such as cheeses and meat specialities. The Pizzoccheri are another dish, essentially eaten in the valley of Poschiavo. They consist of buckwheat noodles, cooked with potatoes, vegetables and cheese. The emblematic dessert of the Grisons is the Bündner Nusstorte. It is essentially a shortcrust pastry filled with a mix of caramelized walnuts and honey. Another similar pastry, but containing chestnuts instead, the Torta di Castagne, is made in the southern valleys, especially in the Val Bregaglia.

Wines are essentially produced in the Bündner Herrschaft. In the vineyards between Fläsch and Malans, 42 types of vines are found, Pinot Noir being the most popular. Wines are also naturally produced in the southern valleys but in smaller quantities. The valley of the Mesolcina is contiguous with the Ticino wine region and that of Poschiavo is contiguous with the Valtellina wine region. Numerous breweries can be found in the canton as well. The largest, located at Chur, is Calanda Bräu.

Radiotelevisiun Svizra Rumantscha is the Romansh-speaking division of the Swiss Broadcasting Corporation and focuses on the Grisons. Die Südostschweiz (in German) and La Quotidiana (Romansh) are some of the most important written media of the region.

Nature
The Grisons successfully reintroduced ibex in the early 20th century after it had all but died out from the Alps, except for an area in the Aosta Valley in Italy, Parco Nazionale Gran Paradiso. Similarly, it reintroduced the bearded vulture and lynx in the 21st century, which had been extinguished, though the lynx remains rare.

See also

Swiss Alps
Three Leagues

Note

References

External links

Official Canton website
Canton of the Grisons Tourism website
Short documentary from the cantonal authorities
Official Canton of the Grisons statistics website

 

 
Cantons of Switzerland
Regions of Europe with multiple official languages
States and territories established in 1803
1803 establishments in Switzerland